Lasioseius is a genus of mites in the family Ascidae.

Species
 Lasioseius albatus (Parvez, Iqbal & Akbar, 2000)      
 Lasioseius americanella de Leon, 1964      
 Lasioseius analis Evans, 1958      
 Lasioseius arboreus Chant, 1963      
 Lasioseius athiasae Nawar & Nasr, 1991      
 Lasioseius athiashenriotae de Leon, 1963      
 Lasioseius berlesei (Oudemans, 1938)      
 Lasioseius bilineatus Karg, 1975      
 Lasioseius bispinosus Evans, 1958      
 Lasioseius boommai Womersley, 1956      
 Lasioseius boomsmai Womersley, 1956      
 Lasioseius chelaserratus Naeem, Dobkin & OConnor, 1985      
 Lasioseius cinnyris Fain & Mariaux, 1991      
 Lasioseius confusus Evans, 1958      
 Lasioseius corticeus Lindquist, 1971      
 Lasioseius cortisimilis Karg, 1994      
 Lasioseius cuppa Walter & Lindquist, 1997      
 Lasioseius cynari Chant, 1963      
 Lasioseius daanensis Ma, 1996      
 Lasioseius dentatus (Fox, 1946)      
 Lasioseius dentroctoni Chant, 1963      
 Lasioseius drosophili Chant, 1963      
 Lasioseius dupliramus Karg, 1994      
 Lasioseius elegans Fain, Hyland & Aitken, 1977      
 Lasioseius epicriodopsis de Leon, 1963      
 Lasioseius epicrioides (Krantz, 1962)      
 Lasioseius euarmatus Karg, 1994      
 Lasioseius eupodis Karg, 1994      
 Lasioseius extremus (Daneshvar, 1987)      
 Lasioseius faustus (Parvez, Iqbal & Akbar, 2000)      
 Lasioseius fenchihuensis Tseng, 1978      
 Lasioseius fimetorum Karg, 1971      
 Lasioseius fissurae Karg, 1980      
 Lasioseius fissuratus Berlese, 1916      
 Lasioseius floralis Karg, 1976      
 Lasioseius formosus Westerboer, 1963      
 Lasioseius furcisetus Athias Henriot, 1959      
 Lasioseius garambae Krantz, 1962      
 Lasioseius glomerulus Karg, 1979      
 Lasioseius grandis Berlese, 1916      
 Lasioseius inconspicuus Westerboer, 1962      
 Lasioseius indicus Bhattacharyya, Sanyal & Bhattacharya, 2000      
 Lasioseius japonicus Ehara, 1965      
 Lasioseius jilinensis Ma, 1996      
 Lasioseius kargi Kandil, 1980      
 Lasioseius kinikinik Walter & Lindquist, 1989      
 Lasioseius krantzi Chant, 1963      
 Lasioseius kshamae Bhattacharyya, 2003      
 Lasioseius lacunosus Westerboer, 1963      
 Lasioseius lanciolatus Chant, 1963      
 Lasioseius lendis (Parvez, Iqbal & Akbar, 2000)      
 Lasioseius leptoscuti Karg, 1994      
 Lasioseius liaohaorongae Ma-Liming, 1996      
 Lasioseius lindquisti Nasr & Abou-Awad, 1987      
 Lasioseius malacca Gupta & Paul, 1992      
 Lasioseius manyarae Hurlbutt, 1972      
 Lasioseius matthyssei Chant, 1963      
 Lasioseius mcgregori Chant, 1963      
 Lasioseius medius Gu-Yiming & Guo-Xiangu, 1994      
 Lasioseius meridionalis Chant, 1963      
 Lasioseius mirabilis Christian & Karg, 1992      
 Lasioseius mouchei Loots, 1980      
 Lasioseius multidentatus Karg, 1994      
 Lasioseius multisetus Chant, 1963      
 Lasioseius multispathus Gu & Huang, in Gu, Wang & Huang 1990      
 Lasioseius mumai de Leon, 1963      
 Lasioseius nambirimae Krantz, 1962      
 Lasioseius nomus Athias Henriot, 1959      
 Lasioseius oblongus (Ewing, 1909)      
 Lasioseius oculus Karg, 1980      
 Lasioseius ometes (Oudemans, 1903)      
 Lasioseius ometisimilis Westerboer, 1963      
 Lasioseius operculi Karg, 1980      
 Lasioseius oryzaephilus Koshanova, 1987      
 Lasioseius parabispinosus Kandil, 1980      
 Lasioseius paraconfusus Li, Yang & Li, 2000      
 Lasioseius parberlesei Bhattacharyya, 1968      
 Lasioseius paucispathus Gu & Wang, in Gu, Wang & Huang 1990      
 Lasioseius pellitus Karg, 1994      
 Lasioseius penicilliger Berlese, 1916      
 Lasioseius peritremus Nasr & Abou-Awad, 1987      
 Lasioseius peterfuldi Ohmer, Fain & Schuchmann, 1991      
 Lasioseius phytoseioides Chant, 1963      
 Lasioseius plumatus Karg, 1980      
 Lasioseius podocinoides Berlese, 1916      
 Lasioseius porulosus de Leon, 1963      
 Lasioseius praevius Gu-Yiming & Guo-Xiangu, 1994      
 Lasioseius punctatus Gu & Huang, in Gu, Wang & Huang 1990      
 Lasioseius punjabensis Bhattacharyya & Sanyal, 2002      
 Lasioseius pusillus Berlese, 1916      
 Lasioseius qiamensis Gu & Huang, in Gu, Wang & Huang 1990      
 Lasioseius qinghaiensis Wang & Li, 2001      
 Lasioseius quadrisetosus Chant, 1960      
 Lasioseius quandong Walter & Lindquist, 1997      
 Lasioseius queenslandicus (Womersley, 1956)      
 Lasioseius reticulatus Bhattacharyya, 1968      
 Lasioseius rostratus Karg, 1996      
 Lasioseius rugosa (Halliday, 1995)      
 Lasioseius safroi (Ewing, 1920)      
 Lasioseius sagittarius Ishikawa, 1975      
 Lasioseius sahai Bhattacharyya, Sanyal & Bhattacharya, 2000      
 Lasioseius saltatus Karg, 1980      
 Lasioseius scapulatus Kennett, 1958      
 Lasioseius schizopilus Gu & Huang, in Gu, Wang & Huang 1990      
 Lasioseius scilliticus Tseng, 1978      
 Lasioseius sewai Nasr & Abou-Awad, 1987      
 Lasioseius similis Berlese, 1916      
 Lasioseius sinensis Bei & Yin, 1995      
 Lasioseius sisiri Bhattacharyya, Sanyal & Bhattacharya, 1998      
 Lasioseius spatulus Gu & Wang, in Gu, Wang & Huang 1990      
 Lasioseius spectabilis de Leon, 1973      
 Lasioseius subterraneus Chant, 1963      
 Lasioseius sugawarai Ehara, 1964      
 Lasioseius taiwanicus Tseng, 1978      
 Lasioseius tetraspinosus Karg, 1980      
 Lasioseius thermophilus Willmann, 1942      
 Lasioseius traveni Walter & Lindquist, 1997      
 Lasioseius triangularis Bhattacharyya & Sanyal, 2002      
 Lasioseius tridentis Karg, 1979      
 Lasioseius trifurcipilus Gu & Guo, 1996      
 Lasioseius trigonus Karg, 1994      
 Lasioseius tuberculatus Karg, 1980      
 Lasioseius wangi Ma, 1988      
 Lasioseius wondjina Walter & Lindquist, 1997      
 Lasioseius yini Bai, Fang & Chen, 1995      
 Lasioseius youcefi Athias Henriot, 1959      
 Lasioseius zaluckii Walter & Lindquist, 1997      
 Lasioseius zerconoides Willmann, 1954      
 Lasioseius zicsii Kandil, 1980

References

Ascidae